The First Presbyterian Church in Phoenix, Arizona, is a historic church designed by architect Norman F. Marsh.  Located at 402 W. Monroe Street, the church was built in 1927, in the Spanish Colonial Revival style. It was added to the National Register of Historic Places in 1993.

It is a U-shaped building  in plan.

In 2012, the building was acquired by City of Grace, a nondenominational church, to serve as their Phoenix campus.

See also

References

External links
City of Grace

Churches in Phoenix, Arizona
Presbyterian churches in Arizona
National Register of Historic Places in Phoenix, Arizona
Churches on the National Register of Historic Places in Arizona
Churches completed in 1927
Spanish Colonial Revival architecture in Arizona
Spanish Revival architecture in the United States